Skræmetindene is a mountain in Vang Municipality in Innlandet county, Norway. The mountain is surrounded by several other notable mountains including Vennisfjellet to the southwest, Mjellknapp to the south, and Trollfonneggi to the northwest.

See also
List of mountains of Norway by height

References

Vang, Innlandet
Mountains of Innlandet